Thomas Care Reed (born March 1, 1934) was the 11th Secretary of the Air Force from January 2, 1976 to April 6, 1977 under Gerald Ford and Jimmy Carter. Previously he was a senior aide to Governor Ronald Reagan in California.<ref>Thomas C. Reed, At the Abyss: An Insider's History of the Cold War//</ref>

Early life
He was born in New York City, N.Y., in 1934. He attended Deerfield Academy, and then received a bachelor of science degree in mechanical engineering from Cornell University, graduating first in his class in 1956. As an undergraduate, he was enrolled in Cornell's Air Force Reserve Officer Training Corps program and was the highest-ranking officer, cadet colonel, during his senior year. He was designated a distinguished military graduate and was commissioned as a second lieutenant in the Air Force upon graduation.  Reed was elected into the Sphinx Head Society during his senior year.

Military career
Reed began active duty with the Air Force in November 1956, and served until 1959 as technical project officer for the Minuteman Re-Entry Vehicle System with the Air Force's Ballistic Missile Division. While on this assignment, he attended the University of Southern California during off-duty hours and earned a master of science degree in electrical engineering.

In 1959, he was assigned to the Lawrence Radiation Laboratory of the University of California, engaged in thermonuclear weapons physics. He was released from active duty with the Air Force in May 1961, but he rejoined the Lawrence Radiation Laboratory as a civilian for the 1962 test series, continuing there as a consultant until 1967.

In 1962, Reed organized Supercon Ltd. of Houston, Texas, as its managing partner. Supercon developed and produced alloys superconducting at cryogenic temperatures.

While maintaining an interest in Supercon Ltd., Reed organized the Quaker Hill Development Corporation at San Rafael, California, in 1965, and served as its treasurer, president and chairman. Quaker Hill has agricultural, recreational and construction projects in California and Colorado.

Reed joined the Department of Defense as an assistant to the secretary and deputy secretary of defense in 1973, and was appointed director of Telecommunications and Command and Control Systems in February 1974.

Political career
Reed was also active in the political world.  He was an organizer for Ronald Reagan's first campaign for governor of California in 1966.  He helped finance Governor Reagan's first unsuccessful run for the presidency in 1968.  Reed established a national network of political operatives and hired F. Clifton White, the noted political strategist, to guide the effort.  Reagan lost to Richard Nixon.  Reed managed Reagan's successful gubernatorial re-election campaign in 1970.  In 1972, Reed performed as a national operative for the Nixon presidential re-election drive.  

Reed, a California business executive and former Air Force Secretary under presidents Ford and Carter, served under president Reagan as a vice chairman of the newly created National Commission on Strategic Forces. He has been a longtime friend of both Reagan and the National Security Adviser, William P. Clark. Clark, especially, is known to have thought highly of Mr. Reed and asked him to take on several key assignments, including reviews of defense and strategic planning. 

Reed's financial dealings in 1981 as a private businessman were investigated for alleged insider trading by a federal prosecutor in New York City, and he resigned as President Reagan's Special Assistant for National Security Affairs. After a jury trial in 1985, Reed was found not guilty.

Writing career
On March 9, 2004, At the Abyss: An Insider's History of the Cold War, an  autobiographical book about his experience at Lawrence Livermore National Laboratory through his time as an advisor to President Ronald Reagan. It reveals new details about the 1962 Cuban Missile Crisis, the Central Intelligence Agency, the Farewell Dossier, and other facets of the Cold War. It also describes a CIA plan approved by Reagan to undermine the Soviet Union's ability to sell natural gas to Western Europe by secretly installing malware in the technology used to operate pipelines. The effort resulted in a huge pipeline explosion in Siberia in the summer of 1982, he wrote.

Reed's second book, co-authored with Danny B. Stillman, was titled The Nuclear Express: A Political History of the Bomb and Its Proliferation and was published in January 2009.  One of the authors' most notable contentions is that in 1982 China made a policy decision to flood the developing world with atomic know-how. In February 2012, Reed published a spy novel titled The Tehran Triangle'' (Black Garnet Press 2012). The book is about Iran's attempt to build and detonate an atomic bomb in the United States.

References

1934 births
Living people
United States Secretaries of the Air Force
Cornell University College of Engineering alumni
USC Viterbi School of Engineering alumni
Deerfield Academy alumni
Ford administration personnel
Carter administration personnel